The Cumaovası railway station is a railway station in Turkey. The Turkish State Railways serve the station with regional trains to Basmane station in İzmir and Ödemiş, Tire, Aydın, Nazilli and Söke in the south. The station will also be the southern terminal of the İZBAN commuter rail system.

Cumaovası Yard is a small rail yard located next to the station and is one of İZBAN's two main depots along with the Çiğli Maintenance Facility.

Railway stations in İzmir Province
Railway stations opened in 1860
1860 establishments in the Ottoman Empire